Polyptychia fasciculosa is a moth of the family Notodontidae first described by Cajetan and Rudolf Felder in 1874. It is found in the Guiana Shield and in Amazonia in South America, including Colombia.

Larvae feed on Passiflora species.

External links
Species page at Tree of Life Web Project

Notodontidae of South America
Moths described in 1874